Don Giovanni in Sicilia, internationally released as Don Juan in Sicily, is a 1967 Italian comedy-drama film directed by Alberto Lattuada. It is loosely based on the novel with the same title by Vitaliano Brancati.

Cast 
 Lando Buzzanca: Giovanni Percolla
 Katia Moguy: Ninetta Marconella
 Katia Christine: Françoise
 Ewa Aulin: Wanda
 Stefania Careddu: Landlady
 Carletto Sposito: Scannapieco
 Elio Crovetto

References

External links

1967 films
Films directed by Alberto Lattuada
Italian comedy-drama films
1967 comedy-drama films
Commedia all'italiana
Films based on Italian novels
Films based on the Don Juan legend
1960s Italian films